P40 may refer to:

Proteins
 Interleukin-12 subunit beta
 Neutrophil cytosolic factor 4
 Ribosomal protein SA

Vehicles

Carro Armato P 40, an Italian tank
Curtiss P-40 Warhawk, an American military aircraft
Percival Prentice, a British trainer aircraft
Pottier P.40, a French sport aircraft
P40 Genesis, an American locomotive

Other uses
 Huawei P40, a smartphone
 Kel-Tec P-40, a pistol
 Nonidet P-40, a detergent
 P-40 APPLE mine, a Vietnamese mine
 P-40 radar, a Soviet radar
 Papyrus 40, a biblical manuscript
 Phosphorus-40, an isotope of phosphorus
 ThinkPad P40 Yoga, a laptop
 P40, a Nissan P engine